"The Ballad of Yoel Moshe Salomon" is a 1970 Israeli popular song by Arik Einstein, with lyrics by Yoram Taharlev and music by Shalom Hanoch. In whimsical fashion, the lyrics tell of a trip by the founders of the Petah Tikva moshava (agricultural colony) to inspect the land around the village of Umm Labes in the Yarkon Valley on which the colony was subsequently established. The song helped fuel a controversy amongst descendants of the founders of Petah Tikva regarding the relative roles of their ancestors in establishing the colony. It is an example of how popular song is used in Israel in constructing historical myths.

Historical background
Jewish philanthropists had begun to acquire land in Palestine for agricultural purposes as early as the 1850s. Sir Moses Montefiore purchased ten hectares of orange groves outside Jaffa in 1855, to be worked by Jews from that city. In 1870, the Alliance Israelite Universelle founded the Mikveh Israel agricultural school some five kilometres south of Jaffa on 260 hectares of land leased from the Turkish government. Also in the 1850s, a Baghdadi Jew named Shaul Yehuda purchased a farm near Colonia, outside Jerusalem. It later became the community of Motza.

The religiously observant Jews from the Old Yishuv in Jerusalem, who founded Petah Tikva, had initially been less successful in obtaining agricultural land. The Arab intermediary through whom they were to have been purchased 4000 dunams near Hebron in 1875 decided to buy the land for himself. Their attempt to acquire land at Khirbat Deiran near Ramla also failed, though that property was eventually purchased in 1890 on behalf of a group of Polish Jews. There they established the colony of Rehovot. The eventual founders of Petah Tikva had also tried to purchase land near Jericho in 1876 for a colony they intended to name Petah Tikva ‘Opening of Hope’. The name Petah Tikva is a biblical reference associated with the Achor Valley near Jericho. The name was later transferred to the colony established near Jaffa.

In 1878 the founders of Petah Tikva learned of the availability of land northeast of Jaffa near the village of Umlabes. The land was owned by two Christian businessmen from Jaffa, Antoine Bishara Tayan and Selim Qassar, and was worked by some thirty tenant farmers. Tayan's property was the larger, some 8,500 dunams, but much of it was in the malarial swamp of the Yarkon Valley. Qassar's smaller block, some 3,500 dunams, lay a few kilometres to the south of the Yarkon River, away from the swampland. It was this healthier area that was purchased on 30 July 1878. Tayan's holdings were purchased later when a second group of settlers, known as the Yarkonim, arrived in Petah Tikva in the following year.

The fear of malaria proved well-founded when an epidemic broke out in 1880, forcing the abandonment of the settlements on both holdings. Those who remained in the area moved south to Yehud. After Petah Tikva was reoccupied by Bilu immigrants in 1883 some of the original families returned. With funding for swamp drainage provided by Baron Edmond de Rothschild, the colony became more stable.

The founders and first settlers of Petah Tikva are generally acknowledged to include Zerach Barnett, David Gutmann, Eleazar Raab and his sons Yehuda & Moshe Shmuel Raab, Yoel Moshe Salomon, and Yehoshua Stampfer. Some accounts add Nathan Gringart (who provided financing to the colony but didn't actually take up residence there), Michal Leib Katz (Zanger), and Rabbi Aryeh Leib Frumkin, one of the better known of the Yarkonim.

Yaari's account of the Umlabes inspection

Yoram Taharlev was inspired to write The Ballad of Yoel Moshe Salomon after reading the account of the founding of Petah Tikva in Avraham Yaari's Memories of the Land of Israel (1947). That account was grounded in the version of events provided by Yoel Moshe Salomon's son Tuviah for the Petah Tikva 50th Anniversary Commemorative volume of 1929.

In Yaari's account, in the summer of 1878 four of the future purchasers—Gutmann, Salomon, Stampfer, and Barnett–go out from Jaffa to inspect the land around Umlabes, the future site of Petah Tikva. They spend the day there, and are favourably impressed, but have worries regarding the unhealthy physical appearance of the tenant farmers. Gutmann, Stampfer, and Barnett return to Jaffa in the evening, but Salomon, an Arabic speaker, stays behind to make more enquiries about the health of the fellahin. He learns that their ill health is attributed locally to the swampy conditions of the Yarkon Valley.

Salomon returns to his companions and advises that they purchase the parcel of land further to the south, near the village of Yahudiyah and away from the Yarkon itself. To allay their doubts regarding whether to proceed, the group engage a Greek doctor to advise them on the suitability of the land on offer for  settlement. From atop a ruined house, the doctor surveys the area. He notices the absence of birds, despite there being ample food for them, and concludes that the area is unhealthy and unfit for humans. Despite the doctor's advice, Salomon, Gutmann, and Stampfer–Barnett not being mentioned as present on this second visit–decide to proceed. Initially they purchase only Qassar's land, away from the river.

The Ballad
The ballad deals with the visit to Umlabes, the future site of Petah Tikva, by those who would subsequently purchase the lands around the village. Taharlev's version of the story differs from Yaari's account in a number of respects. First, Taharlev admits that he has combined into one what Yaari describes as two separate visits to Umlabes. Second, he identifies the Greek doctor by name, as a Dr. Mazaraki. Third, he makes Salomon the hero of the piece, the only one of the four who initially chooses to ignore the doctor's advice.

(The first mention of Dr. Mazaraki in relation to the founding of Petah Tikva was six years afterward, in an article in the 1848 issue of a Hebrew literary annual.In that article, the Greek doctor's name appeared in the form  Azrayike. According to Israeli historian Yosef Lang, there were two Mazaraki brothers in Jerusalem. Both were physicians who at one time or another were associated with the Sephardi Jewish hospital Misgav Ladach. Lang identifies the elder, Karlemo, as the one who probably advised the founders of Petah Tikva of the health dangers of the Yarkon Valley swamps.)

The opening words of the ballad set the scene:  beboker lach bishnat tarlach "On a humid morning in the year 1878". Five riders leave Jaffa that morning. Four are named in the second verse–Stampfer, Gutmann, Barnett, and Salomon. These men are to become the founders of Petah Tikva. Salomon is already being portrayed as a heroic figure, riding "with a sword in his sash". The fifth rider, Dr. Mazaraki, is introduced in the third verse, along with a reference to the Yarkon Valley through which they rode. The five riders reach Umlabes and its "swamps and thickets" in verse four, and climb a hill to survey the surroundings.

In verses five and six, Mazaraki gives his verdict on the property. He notes the absence of bird song, which he regards as a very bad sign. In verse six the doctor declares: "If no birds are heard/death reigns here./My advice is that we depart this place quickly/so off I go". The doctor mounts up and returns to the city in verse seven, accompanied by Stampfer, Gutmann, and Barnett. Only Salomon "with his prophetic eyes" remains behind to spend the night on that hill, we are told in verse eight.

In its final four verses, the ballad's tone changes from narrative to whimsy and fantasy. During the night, says the ballad, Salomon grows wings and flies over the area. The balladeer allows that "maybe it was just a dream/maybe just a legend". In the morning, the last two verses tell us, "the accursed valley was filled with the chirping of birds/and there are those who say that to this day/along the Yarkon/the birds sing of Yoel Moshe Salomon".

Recording and public recognition

The Ballad of Yoel Moshe Salomon was recorded in 1970 by Arik Einstein, a popular artist in the then emerging Israeli rock music genre. It was the final track on Einstein's and composer Shalom Hanoch's influential album Shablul ‘Snail’, and was featured in an accompanying film by the same name. The ballad was also included on Arik Einstein's album Good Old Israel in 1973. A measure of the ballad's popularity is the extent to which its version of events has become part of the public memory of the foundation of Petah Tikva.

In 2000, the artist Avi Blitshtein used the Ballad as the theme for a mural in the underpass at the Geha junction in Petah Tikva. The mural depicts the five characters from the song in front of a hill and surrounded by birds. Blitshtein painted from photos provided by the municipality, except in the case of Dr. Mazaraki, for whom no likeness was available. Blitshtein drew him from his imagination. The photo of Zerah Barnett provided by the city proved not to be Barnett at all. It was a photo of Avraham Shapira, the head of the village guards in Petah Tikva from 1890.

The 130th anniversary of the founding of Petah Tikva provided further opportunities for public reference to the Ballad. On 5 November 2008, five riders dressed in period costume re-enacted the trip from Jaffa to Petah Tikva. Taharlev had already imagined Salomon and his companions as those riders. In an ‘updated’ version of the Ballad, a 170-year-old Yoel Moshe Salomon and his companions get stuck in traffic between Jaffa and Petah Tikva. The actual re-enacted ride was timed to arrive at Founders Square in Petah Tikva at 4 pm, where a set of five sculptures by Shmuel Ben-Ami were unveiled. Ben-Ami's sculptures were commissioned by a local Petah Tikva company. He had been instructed to replace Mazaraki, for whom no model was available, by a representation of Yehuda Raab. Though acknowledged as one of Petah Tikva's founders, Raab is not mentioned in the Ballad.

Another statue, by the sculptor Rami Golshani, was set up on Haim Ozer Street in Petah Tikvah. It depicts Yoel Moshe Salomon, with wings, riding a Harley Davidson motorcycle. On the base of the statue is a line (in Hebrew) from the song: "And between midnight and first light, all of a sudden Salomon grew the wings of a bird."

Controversies
According to Israeli historian Yosef Lang, the controversy regarding the founding of Petah Tikva began with the publication of the Petah Tikva 50th anniversary commemorative volume in 1929. That volume presented the Salomon family's version of events. The disputes concern who was involved, at what point, and in what capacity. Many of the protagonists in these disputes are themselves descendants or relatives of the founders. In the versions each presents of the founding of Petah Tikva, they stress the role of their own families. "As many founders as there are, there are that many histories of the place, and each family writes a biographical version of its own as the history of the colony," wrote professor of literature Yaffah Berlovitz, a great-granddaughter of Zerah Barnett. Eli Eshed, a writer on Israel popular culture and a member of the Salomon family, refers to the controversy as ‘version wars’.

The Ballad provided new fuel for the disputes when its account of events came to serve as the basis for much of the public commemoration of the 130th anniversary of the founding of Petah Tikva. Articles on the subject appeared in Israeli newspapers, and complaints were received by the municipality of Petah Tikva. When the journalist—and Barnett's descendant—Yaffah Berlovitz was interviewed by Eli Eshed, she drew attention to the fact that Salomon had discouraged the Yarkonim and had later abandoned the colony to return to Jerusalem. She concluded that "to present him [Yoel Moshe Salomon] as a hero, it's really ridiculous, even with the apologetics at the end that say that it's a story or a dream". The writer and Raab descendant Ehud ben Ezer protested to the municipality of Petah Tikva regarding its handling of the 130th anniversary celebrations and the scant attention accorded to the role of Eleazer and Yehuda Raab. In his interview with Eshed, he worried that the Ballad risked being confused with history. Ben Ezer quoted an unnamed Petah Tikva official who had told him that "the history is what Yoram Taharlev wrote". Ben Ezer added that "the education system in the schools, which is to say the authors of textbooks and certainly the teachers too take the ballad as the single authorised source for teaching about the history of Petah Tikva,…". His worries may have some justification. The only name mentioned in Howard Sachar's frequently cited history of Israel, with respect to the founding of Petah Tikva, is that of Yoel Moshe Salomon.

At the core of these disputes is the role that music has had in Israel as a vehicle for creating a national ethos and for disseminating national ideology. With regard to the Ballad, its lyricist Yoram Taharlev observed that "it is in the nature of a mythological song that it created a myth", and noted that a similar controversy arose around another of his songs, the Six Day War song Ammunition Hill released in 1968. Ben Ezer complained that learning about the founding of Petah Tikva from the Ballad would be "like learning about the Israeli War of Independence only from Nathan Alterman’s poem Silver Platter. He worried that the events themselves might be forgotten, "leaving only the songs", and wondered whether, in the future, the history of Israel might become confused with the history of Israeli poetry and song.

The term Ben Ezer used for such songs—  hazemer ha'ivri "Hebrew Song"—refers to a certain genre of Israeli music, also known as  shirei eretz yisrael "Songs of the Land of Israel" (SLI). This is a genre of Israeli national ‘folk music’ developed in the pre-state period and gradually formed into a recognised musical canon. Its content was nationalistic. The genre served an ideological function—to celebrate in song the landscape of the Land of Israel, the cultivation of that land, and its defence. The Ballad was written early in what Regev and Seroussi call the middle period of the SLI genre, when attitudes toward such songs were becoming tinged with nostalgia. The Ballad adds a playful tone to conventional SLI themes. Like other instances of the SLI canon, the Ballad has been used to create a historical memory in which myth and history are intertwined. Though it might be faulted as history, the Ballad has ensured that the founding of Petah Tikva remains a part of popular Israeli collective memory.

References

References

 
 
 
 
  This page is a discussion (in Hebrew) of the Ballad and of the controversy it generated, with excerpts from interviews with many of those involved, including Yoram Taharlev, Yaffa Berlovitz, Ehud Ben Ezer, Avi Blitshtein, and Shmuel Ben Ami. The page also contains a number of photos of individuals and art works connected to the Ballad, including one purported to be of Dr. Mazaraki.

External links
 
  Lyrics of the Ballad in Hebrew, with Arik Einstein's recorded version, on the Shironet web site.
  Transliteration and English translation of the Ballad by George Jakubovits.
  Transliteration and English translation of the Ballad by Michael Sherman.
  The Ballad in Hebrew with a rhyming English translation by Donny Inbar.
  Yoram Taharlev's English website.
  Yoram Taharlev's page on the Ballad [Hebrew].
  A brief biography of Yoel Moshe Salomon on the Salomon family bicentennial web site.
  An article on Zerah Barnett's contribution to the founding of Petah Tikva.

1970 songs
Hebrew-language songs
Israeli culture
Israeli songs
Petah Tikva
Songs about Israel